The Gangneung Olympic Park is a sports complex area in Gyo-dong, Gangneung, South Korea, which contains four of the 2018 Olympic Games venues and served as the Olympic Park.

It includes the following venues: 
Gangneung Hockey Centre – Ice Hockey (men competition)
Gangneung Curling Centre – Curling
Gangneung Oval - Speed skating
Gangneung Ice Arena – Short track speed skating and Figure skating

The Gangneung Stadium is also located in the same area, but was not an Olympic venue.

Sports venues in Gangneung
Venues of the 2018 Winter Olympics
Tourist attractions in Gangneung
Olympic Parks
Sports complexes in South Korea